The Crusher in the Tushar is a 69-mile bicycle race, starting in the historic town of Beaver, Utah, and finishing at the Eagle Mountain Ski Resort, featuring equal parts of paved & unpaved sections, and over 10,500 feet of climbing.

It was created by professional cyclist Burke Swindlehurst who trained in the Tushar Mountains in high school.  

The inaugural event, in July 2011, was won by the American professional cyclist Tyler Wren (of Team Jamis-Sutter Home) in the pro men's event. The pro women's event was won by multi-time Canadian Olympian Clara Hughes.

References

External links

2011 establishments in Utah
Beaver County, Utah
Cycle races in the United States
Recurring sporting events established in 2011
Sports competitions in Utah